General elections were held in Kuwait on 27 January 1975. Around 260 candidates contested the election, which saw pro-government candidates remain the largest bloc in Parliament. Voter turnout was 60.1%.

Results

References

Kuwait
Election
Elections in Kuwait
Non-partisan elections